is a Japanese racing car driver, author, and automotive journalist. Kinoshita is affiliated with Toyota Motorsport's GAZOO Racing arm, with whom he scored SP8 class wins in the 2010, 2012, and 2014 24 Hours Nürburgring driving the Lexus LFA. He also won A8 class in the 2004 24 Hours Nürburgring driving a Nissan Skyline GT-R (R34) for Falken Motorsports.

Among Japanese drivers, Kinoshita has raced the most times in the 24 Hours Nürburgring.

He was also a presenter on the Japanese Best Motoring TV series.

Results

Season Series / Class	                                       Standing     Team / Car / Races

GT 2013	24h Nürburgring Nordschleife, Class SP 8 »(single race)             Gazoo Racing » / Lexus LF-A »

GT 2012	24h Nürburgring Nordschleife, Class SP 8 »(single race)	1st         Gazoo Racing » / Lexus LF-A » Class Win

GT 2011	24h Nürburgring Nordschleife, Class SP 8 »(single race)	11th        Gazoo Racing » / Lexus LF-A »

GT 2010	24h Nürburgring Nordschleife, Class SP 8 »(single race)	1st	    Gazoo Racing » / Lexus LF-A » Class Win

GT 2009	24h Nürburgring Nordschleife, Class SP8 »(single race)	4th         Gazoo Racing » / Lexus LF-A »

GT 2008	24h Nürburgring Nordschleife, Class SP8 »(single race)	7th         Team LF-A » / Lexus LF-A »

GT 2007	24h Nürburgring Nordschleife, Class SP6 »(single race)	6th         Sport Auto » / Honda NSX Type-R »

GT 2006	24h Nürburgring Nordschleife, Class SP6 »(single race)	            Sport Auto » / Honda NSX Type-R »

GT 2005	24h Nürburgring Nordschleife, Class A8 »(single race)               Falken Motorsports » / Skyline GT-R (R34) »

GT 2004	24h Nürburgring Nordschleife, Class A8 »(single race)	1st         Falken Motorsports » / Skyline GT-R (R34) » Class Win

GT 2003	All-Japan GT Championship, Class GT300 »	        19th        Team Taisan » / Chrysler Viper GTS-R »(8 of 8 races, 1 Win)

GT 2002	All-Japan GT Championship, Class GT300 »	        18th        Team Taisan » / Porsche 911 GT3-RS (996) »(1 of 8 races)

GT 2002	All-Japan GT Championship, Class GT300 »                            Team Taisan » / Chrysler Viper GTS-R »(2 of 8 races)

GT 2002	All-Japan GT Championship, Class GT300 »                            Amemiya Racing » / Mazda RX-7 (FD) »(1 of 8 races)

GT 2001	All-Japan GT Championship, Class GT300 »                27th        Team Taisan » / Chrysler Viper GTS-R »(5 of 7 races)

2000    Japanese GT Series, 24th

1999	Japanese GT Series, 18th

1998	Japanese GT Series, GT300-19th

1997	Japanese GT Series, GT300-13th

1996	Japanese GT Series, GT300-3rd

1995	Japanese GT Series, GT300-11th

1993	Japanese Touringcars

1992	Japanese Touringcars

1991	Japanese Touringcars

1990	Japanese Touringcars

19**    Japanese N1 Endurance Series

1989	Japanese Touringcars

19**    Japanese Formula 3

Complete Spa 24 Hour results

Complete Japanese Touring Car Championship (-1993) results

References

External links

 Speedsport Magazine career summary

1960 births
Living people
Sportspeople from Tokyo
Japanese racing drivers
Japanese Formula 3 Championship drivers
Asian Touring Car Championship drivers
Japanese Touring Car Championship drivers
Super GT drivers
Toyota Gazoo Racing drivers
Nismo drivers
Nürburgring 24 Hours drivers